The Computer Society of South Africa is a representative association for ICT practitioners and professionals throughout South Africa.

The Computer Society of South Africa focuses its activities, events and publications in five primary areas:

 ICT Policy representing industry practitioners at a local level.
 Education and training to elevate the level of ICT capability in South Africa.
 Professional development and advancement. 
Community development, in terms of projects, that enhances the standards and levels of ICT for the greater good of the country.

See also
 Australian Computer Society (ACS)
 British Computer Society (BCS)
 Canadian Information Processing Society (CIPS)
 New Zealand Computer Society (NZCS)
 Association for Computing Machinery (ACM)

External links 
 Home Page

Professional associations based in South Africa
Research institutes in South Africa